
Year 254 BC was a year of the pre-Julian Roman calendar. At the time it was known as the Year of the Consulship of Asina and Calatinus (or, less frequently, year 500 Ab urbe condita). The denomination 254 BC for this year has been used since the early medieval period, when the Anno Domini calendar era became the prevalent method in Europe for naming years.

Events 
 By place 

 Roman Republic 
 A Roman army led by consuls Gnaeus Cornelius Scipio Asina and Aulus Atilius Calatinus capture Panormus in Sicily.
 The Romans lose control of the Sicilian city of Agrigentum to the Carthaginians.

Births 
 Marcus Livius Salinator, Roman consul and commander during the Second Punic War
 Titus Macchius Plautus, Roman playwright who is credited with forming the foundations of modern comedy (d. 184 BC)

Deaths 
 Areus II, Agiad king of Sparta (son of Acrotatus II)

References